The following is a list of the works by Alfred Schmidt, a 20th-century German philosopher, sociologist and critical theorist associated closely with the Frankfurt School. This list also includes information regarding his work as translator and editor.

Writings

Books
 Der Begriff der Natur in der Lehre von Karl Marx. Frankfurt am Main: Europäische Verlagsanstalt, 1962, DNB 454388497. (4th ed. Hamburg: Europäische Verlagsanstalt, 1993, .)
 Italian translation: Il concetto di natura in Marx. Translated by Giorgio Baratta and Giuseppe Bedeschi. Pref. by Lucio Colletti. Bari: Laterza, 1969.
 English translation: The Concept of Nature in Marx. Translated by Ben Fowkes. London: NLB, 1971, .
 Japanese translation: Marukusu no shizen gainen. Translated by Kiyomi Motohama. Tokyo: Hosei University Press, 1972. (Waseda University Library Catalog)
 Spanish translation: El concepto de naturaleza en Marx. Translated by Julia M. T. Ferrari de Prieto and Eduardo Prieto. 1st ed. México: Siglo Veintiuno, 1976, .
 Danish translation: Naturbegrebet hos Marx. Translated by Svend Dindler. Copenhagen: Rhodos, 1976, .
 French translation: Le concept de nature chez Marx. Translated by Jacqueline Bois. Paris: Presses Univ. de France, 1994, .
 Die . Geschichte und gegenwärtige Bedeutung. München: Kösel, 1970, DNB 963976990.
 Japanese translation: Frankfurt gakuha. "Shakai kenkyūshi" sono rekishi to gendaiteki imi. Translated by Keizō Ikimatsu. Tokyo: Seidosha, 1975. (CiNii Books)
 Hans-Georg Geyer, Hans-Norbert Janowski, Alfred Schmidt: Theologie und Soziologie. Stuttgart: Kohlhammer Verlag, 1970, DNB 456752781.

 Geschichte und Natur im dialektischen Materialismus. Eine Interpretation der Grundrisse. Amsterdam: Paco-Verlag, [ca. 1970]. (Pirated edition. Originally published under the title "Zum Verhältnis von Geschichte und Natur im dialektischen Materialismus", in: Existentialismus und Marxismus, Frankfurt: Suhrkamp, 1965.)
 Geschichte und Struktur. Fragen einer marxistischen Historik. München: Hanser, 1971, .
 Spanish translation: Historia y estructura. Crítica del estructuralismo marxista. Translated by Gustavo Muñoz. Madrid: Alberto Corazón, 1973, .
 Serbo-Croatian translation: Povijest i struktura. Pitanja marksističke historike. Translation: Josip Brkić. Foreword: . Beograd: Izdavački Centar Komunist, 1976. (Series: Marksističke studije; 3)
 Japanese translation: Rekishi to kōzō. Marukusu shugiteki rekishi ninshikiron no shomondai. Tokyo 1977. (CiNii Books)
 Danish translation: Historie og struktur. Translated by Nina Lykke and Hanne Møller. Copenhagen: Medusa, 1978, .
 English translation: History and structure. An essay on Hegelian-Marxist and structuralist theories of history. Translated by Jeffrey Herf. Cambridge, Mass.: MIT Press, 1981, .
 Herbert Marcuse and Alfred Schmidt: Existenzialistische Marx-Interpretation. Frankfurt am Main: Europäische Verlagsanstalt, 1973, . (Series: Studien zur Gesellschaftstheorie.)
 Emanzipatorische Sinnlichkeit. Ludwig Feuerbachs anthropologischer Materialismus. München: Hanser, 1973, .
 Spanish translation: Feuerbach, o, La sensualidad emancipada. Translated by Julio Carabaña. Madrid: Taurus, 1975, .
 Zur Idee der Kritischen Theorie. Elemente der Philosophie Max Horkheimers. München: Hanser, 1974, .
 Alfred Schmidt and : La scuola di Francoforte. Origini e significato attuale. Bari: De Donato, 1972. (SWB union catalog) 
 Serbo-Croatian translation: Frankfurtska škola. Beograd: Komunist, 1974. (Series: Marksizam i savremenost; Kolo 3, knj. 2)
 Werner Post and Alfred Schmidt: Was ist Materialismus? München: Kösel, 1975, .
 Die Kritische Theorie als Geschichtsphilosophie. München: Hanser 1976, .
 Drei Studien über Materialismus. Schopenhauer. Horkheimer. Glücksproblem. München: Hanser, 1977, .

 Kritische Theorie, Humanismus, Aufklärung. Philosophische Arbeiten. Stuttgart: Reclam, 1981, .
 Goethes herrlich leuchtende Natur. Philosophische Studie zur deutschen Spätaufklärung. München: Hanser, 1984, .
 Die Wahrheit im Gewande der Lüge. Schopenhauers Religionsphilosophie. München; Zürich: Piper, 1986, .
 Idee und Weltwille. Schopenhauer als Kritiker Hegels. München; Wien: Hanser, 1988, .
 Japanese translation: Rinen to sekai ishi. Hēgeru no hihansha to shite no shōpenhauā. Translated by Naotake Tōge. Kyoto 1995. (CiNii Books)
 Alfred Schmidt and Bernard Görlich: Philosophie nach Freud. Das Vermächtnis eines geistigen Naturforschers. Lüneburg: zu Klampen, 1995, 
 Tugend und Weltlauf. Vorträge und Aufsätze über die Philosophie Schopenhauers (1960–2003). Frankfurt am Main: Lang, 2004, .
 Entstehungsgeschichte der humanitären Freimaurerei. Deistische Wurzeln und Aspekte. Ed. by Klaus-Jürgen Grün and Thomas Forwe. Leipzig: Salier-Verlag, 2014,  (posthumous)

Articles, lectures and essays
 Existentialismus und Marxismus. Eine Kontroverse zwischen Sartre, Garaudy, Hyppolite, Vigier und Orcel. Mit einem Beitrag von Alfred Schmidt. Frankfurt am Main: Suhrkamp, 1965. (Series: , vol. 116) 
 "Praxis", in: , Hans Michael Baumgartner, Christoph Wild (eds.): Handbuch Philosophischer Grundbegriffe. Studienausgabe, vol. 4. Kösel: München, 1973, pp. 1107–1138.
 "Humanismus als Naturbeherrschung", in: Merkur, vol. 33 (1979), no. 8, pp. 827–832.
 "Denker der geschichtlichen Wirklichkeit. In memoriam Herbert Marcuse", in: Merkur, vol. 33 (1979), no. 9, pp. 924–926.
 "Anthropologie und Ontologie bei Ernst Bloch", in: Merkur, vol. 35 (1981), no. 2, pp. 117–134.
 "Die in Naturgeschichte verstrickte Menschheit. Überlegungen anläßlich des 100. Todestages von Karl Marx", in: Merkur, vol. 37 (1983), no. 3, pp. 359–361.
 "Deutungen des Mythos im achtzehnten und neunzehnten Jahrhundert. Von Heyne zu Marx", in: : Macht des Mythos – Ohnmacht der Vernunft? Frankfurt am Main: Fischer-Taschenbuch-Verlag, 1989, pp. 125–147.
 "Heidegger und die Frankfurter Schule – Herbert Marcuses Heidegger-Marxismus", in: Peter Kemper (ed): Martin Heidegger – Faszination und Erschrecken. Frankfurt am Main; New York: Campus, 1990, pp. 153–177.
 "Herbert Marcuse – Versuch einer Vergegenwärtigung seiner sozialphilosophischen und politischen Ideen", in: Institut für Sozialforschung (ed): Kritik und Utopie im Werk von Herbert Marcuse. Frankfurt am Main: Suhrkamp, 1992, pp. 11–50.

Radio lectures
 Ludwig Feuerbach und die Negation aller Schulphilosophie. Hessischer Rundfunk, Abendstudio, September 12, 1972.
 Sokrates als Vollender der griechischen Aufklärung. Hessischer Rundfunk, Abendstudio, July 22, 1980.
 Die Freiheit des Individuums in der Philosophie Jean-Paul Sartres. Hessischer Rundfunk, Abendstudio, December 8, 1981.
 Von Vico zum historischen Materialismus. Hessischer Rundfunk, Abendstudio, December 28, 1988.
 Die politische Dimension einer Philosophie. Herbert Marcuses Heidegger-Marxismus. Hessischer Rundfunk, Abendstudio, December 12, 1989.

Translations
 Herbert Marcuse: Die Gesellschaftslehre des sowjetischen Marxismus. Neuwied; Berlin: Luchterhand, 1964. (English: Soviet Marxism.)
 Henri Lefèbvre: Probleme des Marxismus, heute. Frankfurt: Suhrkamp, 1965. (French: Problèmes actuels du marxisme.)
 Henri Lefèbvre: Der dialektische Materialismus. Frankfurt: Suhrkamp, 1966. (French: Le matérialisme dialectique.)
 Robert Paul Wolff, Barrington Moore and Herbert Marcuse: Kritik der reinen Toleranz. Frankfurt: Suhrkamp, 1966. (English: A Critique of Pure Tolerance.) 
 Max Horkheimer: Kritik der instrumentellen Vernunft. Frankfurt: S. Fischer, 1967. (English: Eclipse of Reason.)
 Herbert Marcuse: Der eindimensionale Mensch. Studien zur Ideologie der fortgeschrittenen Industriegesellschaft. Neuwied; Berlin: Luchterhand, 1967. (4th. ed., dtv: München 2004. . English: One-Dimensional Man.)
 Herbert Marcuse: Versuch über die Befreiung. Übersetzt von Helmut Reinicke und Alfred Schmidt. Frankfurt: Suhrkamp, 1969. (English: An Essay on Liberation.)

Editorship
  and Alfred Schmidt (eds.): Kritik der politischen Ökonomie heute. 100 Jahre "Kapital". Referate und Diskussionen vom Frankfurter Colloquium im September 1967. Frankfurt: Europäische Verlagsanstalt; Wien: Europa-Verlag, 1968, DNB 457299002.
 Anton Pannekoek: Lenin als Philosoph. Frankfurt am Main: Europäische Verlagsanstalt, 1969.
 Beiträge zur marxistischen Erkenntnistheorie. Aufsätze von György Márkus, Jindřich Zelený, E. W. Iljenkow, Hans-Georg Backhaus, Henri Lefèbvre, Alfred Schmidt. Frankfurt am Main: Suhrkamp, 1969. (Series: , vol. 349)
 Max Horkheimer: Gesammelte Schriften, vol. 1–19. Ed. by Alfred Schmidt and Gunzelin Schmid Noerr. Frankfurt am Main: S. Fischer, 1985-1996.
Ihre Präsenz in Goethes Dichtung, Wissenschaft und Philosophie. Frankfurt am Main; New York: P. Lang, 2000, .
 Iring Fetscher and Alfred Schmidt (eds.): Emanzipation als Versöhnung. Zu Adornos Kritik der "Warentausch"-Gesellschaft und Perspektiven der Transformation. Frankfurt am Main: Verlag Neue Kritik, 2002, .

Festschrift
 Kritischer Materialismus. Zur Diskussion eines Materialismus der Praxis. Für Alfred Schmidt zum 60. Geburtstag. München; Wien: Hanser, 1991, . (Series: Edition Akzente)
 Idee, Natur und Geschichte. Alfred Schmidt zum sechzigsten Geburtstag. Ed. by Klaus-Jürgen Grün and Matthias Jung. Hildesheim; Zürich; New York: Olms, 1991, .
 Für einen realen Humanismus. Festschrift zum 75. Geburtstag von Alfred Schmidt. Ed. by Wolfgang Jordan and Michael Jeske. Frankfurt am Main: Lang, 2006, . (Series: Philosophie in Geschichte und Gegenwart, vol. 2.)

References

Bibliographies of German writers
Philosophy bibliographies